Biotene (typeset as biotène) is an over-the-counter dental hygiene product currently marketed by GSK. It comes in a number of forms, including toothpaste, mouthwash and gel.

Ingredients

Regular
The main active ingredient in its toothpastes is sodium monofluorophosphate, and prior to the GlaxoSmithKline acquisition it also contained enzymes including glucose oxidase, lactoferrin, lactoperoxidase and lysozyme.

PBF
The PBF (plaque biofilm) product line contained additional enzymes, such as mutanase, dextranase, lysozyme, lactoperoxidase, and glucose oxidase. 
The PBF products have been discontinued.

Benefits
People with xerostomia (dry mouth) may use Biotène to reduce the rate of recurrence of dental plaque.  However, Biotene by itself does not significantly reduce the count of Streptococcus mutans which is the primary initiator of the formation of dental plaque.

Biotène claims to relieve symptoms of dry mouth by providing moisture. Dry mouth can be caused by multiple factors affecting the salivary gland. By keeping the mouth moisturised, Biotène prevents various complications that can arise from prolonged dry mouth. For example, dry mouth results in the impairment of the antimicrobial properties of saliva, which increases the risk of opportunistic infections.  Also, by improving the lubrication of the oropharyngeal mucosa, Biotène can facilitate swallowing and decrease the chances of developing dysphagia. A 2017 pilot study found that perceived swallowing effort decreases significantly following application of a saliva substitute.

Biotène compensates for decreased salivary composition. Lack of saliva compromises the composition and beneficial properties necessary for maintaining the health of the oral cavity and reduces antibacterial actions, which leads to disruption of the oral pH; consequently allowing cariogenic microorganisms to grow and colonise the oral cavity. When stimulation of salivary secretion fails, palliative oral care in the form of mouthwashes and saliva substitutes can be used to counterbalance the lack of initial salivary function. Varying saliva substitutes containing different enzymes, such as those found in Biotène products, reduce oral infection and enhance mouth wetting. Biotène mouth rinses have shown inhibitory effects on growth of preformed biofilms on certain tested bacterial and fungal strains. However, Biotène alone does not act via prevention of plaque build-up mechanism or antimicrobial chemotherapeutic mechanism.

Biotène brand products 
The product line includes toothpaste, mouthwash, spray and gel.

Mechanism of action 
The three primary enzymes in Biotène are Glucose Oxidase, Lactoperoxidase, and Lysozyme. Through antibacterial and healing properties creating a natural protection within the oral cavity, these enzymes are balanced to function to boost and replenish an individual’s salivary defences.

The reduced antibacterial actions of saliva due to the lack of saliva in some individuals can lead to disruption of the oral pH, allowing cariogenic microorganisms to grow and colonise the oral cavity.  For individuals with xerostomia, a commercially available mouth rinse that can be safely used daily to aid in dry mouth relief is essential in oral health maintenance. Various commercially available mouth rinses have been tested on their inhibitory effects on biofilm formation over a 24h period. By slowing the formation of biofilm formation, individuals who use Biotène may reduce the risk of dental caries and other oral diseases that may occur from xerostomia and bacterial accumulation, thus aiding in improving oral and overall health for the long term. However, not all studies support the claim that Biotène makes. For instance, Peridex mouth rinse, an antimicrobial chlorhexidine-based formulation, demonstrated significantly greater prevention of plaque regrowth when compared with water and the enzyme-based Biotène mouth rinse.

References 

 Warde, P., Kroll, B., O'Sullivan, B. et al. "A phase II study of Biotène in the treatment of postradiation xerostomia in patients with head and neck cancer”. Support Care Cancer (2000) 8: 203.

External links
 Biotene web site
 Biotene UK web site
 Biotene Israel web site
 Biotene Australia web site

Oral hygiene
Haleon